Isao Imai may refer to:
 Isao Imai (physicist) (1914–2004), Japanese theoretical physicist
 Isao Imai (judge) (born 1939), member of the Supreme Court of Japan